Gamma Sigma Alpha (or GSA) is a National Academic Greek Honor society recognizing academic excellence among members of Fraternities and sororities. Gamma Sigma Alpha states that its mission is "to recognize and advance academic excellence as a core value of fraternities and sororities". Unlike the Order of Omega, who also reward Greek Life academic successes, Gamma Sigma Alpha does not limit the number of members who can be initiated.

History 
Gamma Sigma Alpha was founded at the University of Southern California on November 9, 1989, by Beth K. Saul and a group of scholastic achievers representing various fraternities and sororities dedicated to the advancement of higher education and academic accomplishment.

Leadership
The current Executive Director is Nicole A. Singleton

Membership and chapters 
As of Spring 2015, Gamma Sigma Alpha has over 215 chapters across the United States and Canada.

Undergraduate students, in their junior or senior year, can apply for membership if they are a member of a Greek fraternity or sorority on campus and have a cumulative grade point average of 3.5 or above (on a 4.0 scale).

Insignia 
The badge of Gamma Sigma Alpha, which can be seen within its seal, consists of a white lit candle with a golden base on a field of Gules (red) with a bend of argent.

References 

University of Southern California
Student organizations established in 1989
Honor societies
1989 establishments in California